Tan Sri Dato’ Seri Ali Abul bin Hassan Sulaiman (3 April 1941 – 25 March 2013) is a former governor of the Central Bank of Malaysia.

Death
He died on 25 March 2013 at the age of 71 due to complications of heart and prostate cancer.

Honours
 :
 Member of the Order of the Defender of the Realm (AMN) (1974)
 Companion of the Order of Loyalty to the Crown of Malaysia (JSM) (1988)
 Commander of the Order of Loyalty to the Crown of Malaysia (PSM) – Tan Sri (1993)

 Member Grand Companion of the Order of Sultan Mahmud I of Terengganu (SSMT) – Dato’ Seri (1995)

 Grand Commander of the Exalted Order of Malacca (DGSM) – Datuk Seri (1996)

 Commander of the Order of the Defender of State (DGPN) – Dato’ Seri (1996)

 Grand Knight of the Order of Sultan Ahmad Shah of Pahang (SSAP) – Dato’ Sri (2002)

References 

Members of the Order of the Defender of the Realm
Companions of the Order of Loyalty to the Crown of Malaysia
Commanders of the Order of Loyalty to the Crown of Malaysia
1941 births
2013 deaths